Joaquín Enseñat (born 22 January 1938) is a Spanish basketball player. He competed in the men's tournament at the 1960 Summer Olympics.

References

1938 births
Living people
Spanish men's basketball players
Olympic basketball players of Spain
Basketball players at the 1960 Summer Olympics
Basketball players from Barcelona